Blende is a Census-designated place (CDP) in and governed by Pueblo County, Colorado, United States. The CDP is a part of the Pueblo, CO Metropolitan Statistical Area. The population of the Blende CDP was 878 at the United States Census 2010. The Pueblo post office  serves the area.

Geography

Demographics

See also

 List of census-designated places in Colorado

References

External links

 Blende, Colorado Mining Claims And Mines
 Pueblo County website

Census-designated places in Pueblo County, Colorado
Census-designated places in Colorado